Eerik Marmei (born 6 May 1970 in Tartu) is an Estonian diplomat.

In 1993, he graduated from the University of Tartu. In 1996, he finished his master studies at Notre Dame University in international relations.

Since 1993, he has worked for Ministry of Foreign Affairs.

Before 2014, he was Ambassador of Estonia to Poland and Romania. From 2014 to 2017, he was Ambassador of Estonia to the United States.

References

Living people
1970 births
Estonian diplomats
Ambassadors of Estonia to the United States 
Ambassadors of Estonia to Poland
Ambassadors of Estonia to Romania  
University of Tartu alumni
People from Tartu